Mistah is a 1994 Philippine action film directed by Ricardo "Bebong" Osorio. The film stars Robin Padilla, Roi Vinzon, BB Gandanghari, Rommel Padilla and Ana Roces. Mistah is a military slang meaning "schoolmate" within the Philippine Military Academy.

The film is streaming online on YouTube.

Plot
Sgt. Mario Cariño's (Robin Padilla) squad, along with a platoon of Army Scout Rangers led by a lieutenant, is seen chasing Muslim rebels across a forest, and is trapped and forced to retreat when an ambush is sprung, losing some of his squadmates. Returning to the camp, he is scolded by his superior (Roi Vinzon) for his insubordination, which he accepts begrudgingly. His squadmates heckle him, which he answers. Camp life is always tense, with rebel snipers taking out sentries, and being bombed and retaliated upon by regular patrols in the area, but they never forget why they are there. Sometimes they go to a town where they buy supplies and treats for Muslim kids, and on one occasion Mario spots a beautiful storekeeper (Ana Roces). They do charitable work, like Mario saving a drowning kid. A rebel Emir is in the same village but halted by an Ulama to harm them; the same Emir confronted the later and turned out to be the uncle of the kid Mario saved. 

A sniper takes out a sentry, alarming the platoon while Mario gets his regular taste of scolding by his commander. Days later, they welcome several privates led by a hot-headed private (Joko Diaz) and his batchmates. Some older soldiers extort the newbies. And when a soldier is heckled for being in love with a beautiful young woman, a brawl starts among the other soldiers until an explosion interrupts them, forcing them to lie down; they're later punished by the Lieutenant, and the soldier commits suicide when he finds out the girl broke up with him. 

Rebels are always harassing and looting Christian villages and the soldiers must chase them out. Mario later gets a leave to visit his family nearby; his father is sick, his friend's wife is blind, and he himself has a fiancée. Many days later, he returns to camp, giving goods to his fellow soldiers.

He tries to court the lass, when he is stopped by a group of fellow soldiers from a different unit; he counters by showing some firepower, which the soldiers flee, then spots a truckful of soldiers to chase them out. He later receives a letter from his parents telling that his father was ill and died; he requests leave but his lieutenant declines. He snaps, and in a drunken stupor he shoots at his officer's bunker and gets reprimanded by their colonel in the office. The lieutenant is replaced by another newbie lieutenant (Rustom Padilla), whom Mario is forced to obey. As their new commander makes him organize a patrol, the newbie soldiers join him. When they patrol the forest another ambush is sprung, killing some, including the three newbies, and they're forced to retreat again. Mario's commander blames him and Mario responds by punching him; a brawl starts, stopped only when another explosion is heard. He later brings the storekeeper into the camp, but then his fiancée arrives. The soldiers help the storekeeper escape while Mario distracts hisfiancée.

The platoon is later tasked to meet up with a rebel Emir, but the talk produces no good result. As rebels disagree with their Emir's decision, they kill a soldier from the unit, along with his wife when they are abducted. The ringleader is executed by the Emir himself, which angers some rebels.

They ambush the lieutenant's batchmate's unit, which Mario rescues; his squad also rescues the lieutenant's patrol unit from another ambush, and the rebels use the incident as an excuse to attack the camp. Mario receives his Officer Promotion exam results and ready to return to main base, when the rebels fire upon the camp with mortars and grenade launchers, killing some of them and putting the rest in their defensive position. They defend and repulse an attack. They send some runners, who are killed by the rebels, who also bomb and kill the rescue unit. The rescue unit's leader is captured and tied on a tree and Mario's unit, short in ammunition and outgunned, is forced to watch as rebels slash the hapless officer, which their Lieutenant forced himself to euthanize his fellow officer. Romy (Rommel Padilla) tries to rescue the commander; a rebel shoots him in his M203 grenade launcher. And another juramentado attack by rebels kills Mario's partner, but repulses with heavy casualties. Mario, the lieutenant, the squad's sniper, the newbie soldier, and three others prepare themselves in a last stand when explosions are heard, this time on the government's side. The government backup fire upon the rebels with mortars, rockets and air support, inflicting the rebels heavy casualties, forcing them to retreat. The soldiers retrieve the dead, the lieutenant unties his fellow batchmate's corpse as the rain falls, Mario is seen crying while kneeling.

The film ends with Mario quoting that "Nobody wins in a war."

Cast
Robin Padilla as Sgt. Mario Cariño
Rustom Padilla as Lt. Flavier
Roi Vinzon as Lt. Duterte
Daniel Fernando as Cpl. Daniel Aquino
Joko Diaz as New Recruit
Ana Roces as Linda
Rommel Padilla as Cpl. Remy De Jesus
Bomber Moran as Alih
Dindo Arroyo as Kumander Ratari
Jun Hidalgo as Kumander Malik
Royette Padilla as Lt. Dela Cruz
Lilet Goldberg as Brenda
Bebong Osorio as Col. Salgado
Liezl Sicangco-Padilla as Brenda
Eddie Infante as Old Man
Maritess Samson as Daniel's Wife
Marissa de Guzman as Junar's Wife
Jun Aristorenas as Willy Santos
Boy Roque as Roque
July Hidalgo as Hidalgo
Val Iglesia as Drunk Man in the restaurant

Production
Mistah was announced by BB Gandanghari at a press conference in December 1993.

Notes

References

External links

Full Movie on Viva Films

1994 films
1994 action films
Philippine action films
Viva Films films